The 1971 North Texas State Mean Green football team was an American football team that represented North Texas State University (now known as the University of North Texas) as a member of the Missouri Valley Conference (MVC) during the 1971 NCAA University Division football season . In their fifth year under head coach Rod Rust, the Mean Green compiled an overall record of  3–8 with a mark of 3–2 in conference play, placing in a three-way tie for second in the MVC.

Schedule

Notes

References

North Texas State
North Texas Mean Green football seasons
North Texas State Mean Green football